The Survey of India is India's central engineering agency in charge of mapping and surveying. Set up in 1767 to help consolidate the territories of the British East India Company, it is one of the oldest Engineering Departments of the Government of India. Its members are from Survey of India Service cadre of Civil Services of India and Army Officers from the Indian Army Corps of Engineers. It is headed by the Surveyor General of India. At present, the Surveyor General is Naveen Tomar.

History
The history of the Survey of India dates back to the 18th century. "First modern scientific survey of India" was undertaken by W. Mather in 1793–96 on instructions of Superintendent of Salem and Baramahal, Col. Alexander Read. The present Dharmapuri district, Krishnagiri district and North Arcot in western Tamil Nadu were then called Baramahal.

The Great Trigonometrical Survey (1802–1852) was started by British surveyor Col. William Lambton on 10 April 1802, heading from St. Thomas Mount in Chennai to the foothills of the Himalayas. 36 inch huge half ton weight Theodolite was used, which took 57 days to measure the 12-km base line. This 5-decade project was completed under Survey General Lt. George Everest in the year 1852. Pioneering mathematician and Surveyor Radhanath Sikdar measured Mount Everest in 1852, with a height of 29,002 feet. Modern measurements indicate the height is 29,037 feet. This is regarded as the beginning of a new age of systematic topographical mapping in India succeeding the classical age, and the founding of one of the oldest survey and mapping agencies in the world.

Organisation
The Survey of India, headquartered at Dehradun, Uttarakhand, has 18 geospatial divisions ranging from the prediction of tides to aerial survey. It has 23 Geo-spatial Data Centers spread across India, each catering to the respective administrative area. Surveyors are the back bone of Survey of India.
Appointments to Group 'A' Civil Stream posts in the Junior Time Scale (Dy Supdtg Surveyor) in Survey of India are made on the basis of competitive Indian Engineering Services examination conducted by the Union Public Service Commission and also through permanent secondment of Army Officers Defence Stream by the Union Public Service Commission.
The important posts/ grades in Survey of India are in the following order of seniority: Draftsman, Plane Tabler, Survey Assistant, Surveyor, Officer Surveyor, Deputy Superintending Surveyor, Superintending Surveyor, Superintending Surveyor (Non-Functional Second Grade)/Deputy Director, Director/Deputy Surveyor General, Additional Surveyor General, Surveyor General.

Responsibilities
 Advisor to the Indian Government: The Survey of India acts as an adviser to the Government of India on all cartography-related matters, such as geodesy, photogrammetry, mapping and map reproduction.
 Geo names: Survey of India is responsible for the naming convention and spellings of names of geographical features of India.
 Certification and publication: Scrutiny and certification of external boundaries of India and Coastline on maps published by the other agencies including private publishers. Publication of tide tables (one year in advance) and maps of India.
 Surveys: geodetic datum, geodetic control network, topographical control, geophysical surveys, cadastral surveying, geologic maps, aeronautical charts within India, such as for forests, army cantonments, large scale cities, guide maps, developmental or conservation projects, etc.
 National borders: Demarcation of the borders and external boundaries of India as well as advice on the demarcation of inter-state boundaries.
 Oceanic tidal prediction: Undertake prediction of tides at 44 ports including 14 foreign ports.
 Research and development: In the area of photogrammetry, cartography, geodesy, topographical surveys and indigenisation of technology.
 Training: Training for the central and state government departments as well as from foreign countries.

Maps
The Survey of India publishes maps and the unrestricted category maps can be obtained at very affordable prices from its several Geo-spatial data centers. Restricted category maps require due approval from government authorities. Many other rules govern the sale and use of Survey of India maps. Only an Indian citizen may purchase topographic maps and these may not be exported from India for any reason. On 15 February 2021, the Government of India announced changes to the country's mapping policy which frees up lot of earlier restrictions related to mapping. A list of restrictions proposed is published by DST for comments by 30 July 2021.

Gallery

See also
 Indian Institute of Surveying & Mapping (IIS&M)
 Survey of India Service
 Cartography of India
 Linguistic Survey of India

References

Further reading 
 
 John Keay. 2000. The Great Arc,  London: Harper Collins. .
  
 
 
 Reginald Henry Phillimore, Historical Records of the Survey of India, 5 vols. Dehra Dun, Survey of India (1945–1968)
 Volume 1: 18th Century; Volume 2: 1800 to 1815; Volume 3: 1815 to 1830; Volume 4: 1830 to 1843; Volume 5: 1844 to 1861

External links 

 
 India Grid System: the coordinate system used by Survey of India.
 Open Series Map (OSM): new map numbering system introduced as per the National Map Policy of 2005 by Survey of India.
 India and Adjacent Countries (IAC): old map numbering system used previously by Survey of India

National mapping agencies
1767 establishments in Great Britain
1767 establishments in India
Government agencies of India
Executive branch of the government of India
Organisations based in Dehradun
Geodesy organizations
Government of British India
Surveying organizations